Theseus Agria Football Club is a Greek football club based in Agria, Magnesia, Greece.

Honours

Domestic

 Thessaly FCA champion: 4
 1991–92, 2004–05, 2006–07, 2017–18
 Thessaly FCA Cup Winners: 2
 1988–89, 2007–08

References

Football clubs in Thessaly
Magnesia (regional unit)
Association football clubs established in 1927
1927 establishments in Greece
Gamma Ethniki clubs